The Happy Canary or The Gay Canary is a 1929 Soviet silent adventure film directed by Lev Kuleshov and starring Galina Kravchenko, Andrey Fayt and Ada Vojtsik.

The film's sets were designed by the art director Sergei Kozlovsky.

Plot
Actress Brio working in a cafe "The Happy Canary", does not suspect that her new acquaintances Brianski and Lugovec are Communists  sent by an underground committee to fight the enemy's counter-intelligence ...

Cast
 Galina Kravchenko as Brio  
 Andrey Fayt as Lugovec  
 Ada Vojtsik as Lugovec' wife  
 Sergey Komarov as Brianski  
 Yuri Vasilchikov as Assistant Chief Secret Service  
 Mikhail Doronin as Chief Secret Service  
 Vladimir Kochetov as French communist soldier  
 Vsevolod Pudovkin as Illusionist  
 Aleksandr Chistyakov as Workman  
 N. Kopysov as Workman  
 Aleksandr Zhutaev as Workman

Reception
Henri Barbusse described Gay Canary as "an amusing picture of the fever of revels and intrigues which took possession of Odessa during the foreign occupation ten years ago".

References

Bibliography 
 Christie, Ian & Taylor, Richard. The Film Factory: Russian and Soviet Cinema in Documents 1896-1939. Routledge, 2012.

External links 
 

1929 films
1929 adventure films
Soviet silent feature films
Soviet adventure films
1920s Russian-language films
Films directed by Lev Kuleshov
Soviet black-and-white films
Silent adventure films